Lafayette Township is one of twenty townships in Allen County, Indiana, United States. As of the 2010 census, its population was 3,354.

Geography

Cities, towns, villages
 Zanesville (north half)

Unincorporated towns
 Aboite at 
 Nine Mile at 
(This list is based on USGS data and may include former settlements.)

Adjacent townships
 Aboite Township (north)
 Wayne Township (northeast)
 Pleasant Township (east)
 Jefferson Township, Wells County (southeast)
 Union Township, Wells County (south)
 Union Township, Huntington County (southwest)
 Jackson Township, Huntington County (west)

Cemeteries
The township contains Fogwell Cemetery.

Major highways

Airports and landing strips
 Fort Wayne International Airport
 Wilcox Airstrip

Rivers
 Little Wabash River

School districts
 Metropolitan School District of Southwest Allen County

Political districts
 Indiana's 3rd congressional district
 State House District 50
 State House District 82
 State Senate District 16
 State Senate District 17
 State Senate District 19

References

Citations

Sources
 United States Census Bureau 2008 TIGER/Line Shapefiles
 United States Board on Geographic Names (GNIS)
 IndianaMap

Townships in Allen County, Indiana
Fort Wayne, IN Metropolitan Statistical Area
Townships in Indiana